Flavio Andrés Salazar Onfray (born 7 October 1965) is a Chilean politician who has served as the minister of science, technology, knowledge and innovation since 2022.

References

External links
 

1965 births
Living people
Uppsala University alumni
Karolinska Institute alumni
21st-century Chilean politicians
Communist Party of Chile politicians
Government ministers of Chile